Thijs van Leeuwen (born 15 July 2001) is a Dutch professional footballer who plays as a midfielder for Eerste Divisie club TOP Oss.

Club career
Van Leeuwen made his professional debut as part of Twente on 12 September 2020, coming on as a substitute for Queensy Menig in a 2–0 win over Fortuna Sittard in the Eredivisie. In October 2020, Van Leeuwen signed a new contract with Twente until 2023 with an option for an additional year. He scored his first goal on 7 November in a 4–2 away win over ADO Den Haag, securing the end result deep into stoppage time. 

Van Leeuwen joined Eerste Divisie club Almere City on 31 August 2021 on loan for the 2021–22 season.

On 31 January 2023, van Leeuwen signed a year-and-a-half-long contract with TOP Oss.

References

External links

2001 births
21st-century Dutch people
People from Heerde
Footballers from Gelderland
Living people
Dutch footballers
Association football midfielders
FC Twente players
Almere City FC players
TOP Oss players
Eredivisie players
Eerste Divisie players